Franz Dunder (6 September 1913 – 23 June 1970) was an Austrian racing cyclist. He rode in the 1936 Tour de France.

References

External links
 

1913 births
1970 deaths
Austrian male cyclists
Place of birth missing